Centenary Stormers FC is an Australian football (soccer) club from Darra, a southwestern suburb of Brisbane. The club is a relative newcomer to the Brisbane football scene, having been formed in 2000. The club currently has a strong emphasis on the development of its junior players with a focus on the age groups running from Under 6s to Under 12s.

The club has participated in senior Football Brisbane competition since 2007 and is expected to compete in the Brisbane Premier League for the first time in 2018.

History
Centenary Stormers Football Club was formed in 2000 and has been registered with Football Brisbane since the beginning of the 2000 season. The club first fielded a team in Football Brisbane competitions in 2007, starting in Metro League Division Five which was then the eighth tier of the FB structure. A second-place finish and Grand Final win the following season resulted in the club being promoted to Metro League Division Three.

Centenary Stormers then achieved a further four promotions between 2011 and 2015, rising four divisions from Metro League 3 Blue to Capital League 1. During this period the club formed a partnership with former national representative Craig Moore and Viva Soccer in late 2012 to run a pilot coaching program to set sporting standards by which a junior player's performance can be measured, managed and accredited, as part of its drive to support all junior players.

Centenary Stormers FC won its first premiership, finishing top of the table in Capital League 3 in 2014.

In 2016, Centenary Stormers was relegated for the first time in their history, appearing safe in Capital League 1 with three rounds to go, but then being overtaken by a late four match winning run by Mount Gravatt.
Centenary Stormers bounced back by winning the 2017 Capital League 2 premiership and are expected to compete in the Brisbane Premier League for the first time in 2018 due to a restructure of senior men's competitions by Football Brisbane.

Seasons

Source:

The tier is the level in the Australian soccer league system

Honours

Metro League 5 Silver – Champions 2008
Capital League 3 – Premiers 2014
Capital League 2 – Premiers 2017

References

External links
 

Soccer clubs in Brisbane
Association football clubs established in 2000
2000 establishments in Australia